The Anapus or Anapos was a river in ancient Acarnania. It was a tributary of the Achelous River, which it joined eighty stadia south of Stratus. 

The name was also applied to a river in Sicily (the modern Anapo).

References

Ancient Acarnania
Rivers of Greece